Jacob "Jack" Block (April 28, 1924 – January 13, 2010) was a psychology professor at UC Berkeley. His main areas of research were personality theory, personality development, research methodology, personality assessment, longitudinal research, and cognition. He often collaborated with his wife Jeanne Block.

His most renowned body of work, undertaken primarily with his wife, was a longitudinal study on a cohort of more than 100 San Francisco Bay Area toddlers. He studied them regularly for nearly 30 years. Unlike most longitudinal studies, the Blocks' focused on the psychological makeup and history of the subjects, rather than quantitative measures such as IQ. The study tracked how the subjects' background influenced their later choices and the outcomes of their lives.

Block was born in Brooklyn, New York, and received a bachelor's degree from Brooklyn College. He earned his Ph.D. from Stanford University in 1950. He received many awards over the years and was a fellow of the American Association for the Advancement of Science.

One of Block's studies drew particular notice in the news media. Published in The Journal of Research in Personality in 2006, it found that subjects who at 3 years old had seemed thin-skinned, rigid, inhibited and vulnerable tended at 23 to be political conservatives. On the other hand, 3-year-olds characterized as self-reliant, energetic, somewhat dominating and resilient were inclined to become liberals.

Book publications
"The Q-Sort Method in Personality Assessment and Psychiatric Research", 1961
"The Challenge of Response Sets", 1965
Lives Through Time, 1971
Personality as an Affect-Processing System, 2002
The Q-Sort in Character Appraisal, 2008

References

External links
UC Berkeley obituary

20th-century American psychologists
1924 births
2010 deaths
Stanford University alumni
Brooklyn College alumni
University of California, Berkeley College of Letters and Science faculty
Quantitative psychologists
Personality psychologists
American psychologists